Departure (Italian: Partire) is a 1938 Italian comedy film directed by Amleto Palermi and starring Vittorio De Sica, María Denis and Giovanni Barrella. It was shot at the Cinecittà Studios in Rome.

Cast
 Vittorio De Sica as Paolo Veronda  
 María Denis as Anna Diana  
 Giovanni Barrella as Anteo Diana  
 Cesare Zoppetti as Marsani  
 Carlo Romano as Giulio  
 Luigi Almirante as Baldassare - il nonno  
  as Miss Jane  
 Clelia Matania as Lolò - la dattilografa  
 Gianni Altieri as Giovanni Mattoni  
 Nicola Maldacea as L'usciere di Anteo  
 Elli Parvo as La contadina con il neonato  
 Emilio Cigoli as L'impiegato dell'agenzia marittima  
 Lilia Silvi as Una dattilografa  
 Rio Nobile as Mattia - l'autista  
 Checco Rissone as Il fattore  
 Mimma Rubino Rossini 
 Roberta Mari 
 Giulio Alfieri 
 Rosanna Schettina 
 Marisa Vernati 
 Gennaro Sabatano 
 Olga Ceretti 
 Lia Rosa 
 Norma Nova 
 Gemma Festa
 Romolo Costa 
 Silvana Jachino as Mimì

References

Bibliography 
 Ruth Ben-Ghiat. Italian Fascism's Empire Cinema. Indiana University Press, 2015.

External links 
 

1938 comedy films
Italian comedy films
1938 films
1930s Italian-language films
Films directed by Amleto Palermi
Italian black-and-white films
Films scored by Alessandro Cicognini
Films shot at Cinecittà Studios
1930s Italian films